Sheylayongium is a monotypic genus of Thelyphonid whip scorpions, first described by Rolando Teruel in 2018. Its single species, Sheylayongium pelegrini is distributed in Cuba.

References 

Arachnid genera
Monotypic arachnid genera
Uropygi